Most measures of religiosity, such as church attendance and affiliation, are positively correlated with the authoritarian personality cluster, which includes submission to authority, conventionality, and intolerance of out-groups. The correlation is especially strong between religious fundamentalism (defined as belief in an "inerrant set of religious teachings") and authoritarianism, both of which are characterized by low openness to experience, high rigidity, and low cognitive complexity. In particular, authoritarianism "is positively associated with a religion that is conventional, unquestioned, and unreflective".

Background

Hundreds of scientific articles have been published investigating the connections between religion and authoritarianism. There is a distinction between psychology, which treats authoritarianism as innate to the personality, and sociology, which considers authoritarianism a result of one's environment and posits that it may be influenced by factors such as religion.

A longitudinal study of Americans born in the 1920s found that this effect held for traditional church-centered religion but not for those that are seeking non-institutional spirituality. The latter mode of religion is "characterized by an openness to new experiences and by creativity and experimentation, characteristics that are antithetical to the conventionality that adheres in authoritarianism".

Specific cases
Throughout history, authoritarian leaders have adopted different policies towards religion, from state atheism to drawing support from religion or co-opting religious leaders and institutions. As part of civil society, organized religion serves as a mediator between the state and citizens, even under authoritarian governments. In Russia, the Russian Orthodox Church enjoys a state monopoly and state subsidies, as well as a blasphemy law that protects it from criticism. Authoritarian leaders may fear that religion will be the source of political opposition, instability, or outright rebellion. Indeed, some scholars and political leaders, such as Václav Havel, have praised the role of religion in undermining authoritarian governments. However, in other cases, religions have engaged in alliances with the state, and religious institutions are not necessarily pockets of dissent or incubators of democracy. Unregistered or minority religions have been suppressed by state authoritarian regimes, such as house churches in China. In 1999, Falun Gong practitioners launched widespread protests against the Chinese government, which led to the persecution of Falun Gong.

See also
 Catholicism in the Second Spanish Republic
 Christian right
 Hindutva
 Jewish right
 Russian Orthodox Church during the Russian revolution
 Wahhabism
Salafism

References

Bibliography

Further reading

 
 
 
 
 
 
 
 
 
 

Religion and government
Sociology of religion
Psychology of religion